Scotinotylus bodenburgi is a species of sheet weaver found in Alaska. It was described by Chamberlin & Ivie in 1947.

References

Linyphiidae
Endemic fauna of Alaska
Spiders of North America
Spiders described in 1947